Mill River Unified Union School District (MRUUSD) is a school district headquartered in North Clarendon, Vermont. It serves, in addition to North Clarendon, Shrewsbury, Tinmouth, and Wallingford. Its predecessor districts operated under the umbrella organization Rutland South Supervisory Union.

History
Tinmouth formally switched to the Rutland South supervisory union from the Rutland Southwest supervisory union circa 2013. Prior to the school district merger Tinmouth residents could choose which high school to attend tuition-free, with the majority choosing Mill River.

By 2015 the Vermont legislature passed Act 46, requiring school districts to consolidate, prompting the predecessor school districts under the supervisory union to formally consolidate into a unified school district. That year the state legislature approved of the consolidation into Mill River.

Schools
 Secondary
 Mill River Union High School
 Elementary
 Clarendon Elementary School
 Shrewsbury Mountain School
 Tinmouth Mountain School
 Wallingford Elementary School

References

External links
 Mill River Unified Union School District
 
 Index of articles - VTDigger
School districts in Vermont
Rutland County, Vermont